Naoda (also spelled Nawda & Nowda) is a town, not identified in 2011 census, with a police station, in the Naoda CD block in the Berhampore subdivision of Murshidabad district in the state of West Bengal, India.

Geography

Location

Area overview
The area shown in the map alongside, covering Berhampore and Kandi subdivisions, is spread across both the natural physiographic regions of the district, Rarh and Bagri. The headquarters of Murshidabad district, Berhampore, is in this area. The entire area is overwhelmingly rural with over 80% of the population living in the rural areas.

Note: The map alongside presents some of the notable locations in the subdivisions. All places marked in the map are linked in the larger full screen map.

Civic administration

Police station
Naoda police station has jurisdiction over the Naoda CD block.

Transport
Baharampur-Amtala Road passes through Naoda.

References

Cities and towns in Murshidabad district